Anthony Howell may refer to:

Anthony Howell (actor) (born 1971), English actor
Anthony Howell (footballer) (born 1986), English footballer
Anthony Howell (performance artist) (born 1945), English poet, novelist and performance artist.
Anthony Howell (admiral) (born 1947), South African Navy officer

See also
Anthony Howells (1832–1915), American businessman and politician 
Toney Howell, involved in the 1912 Racial Conflict of Forsyth County, Georgia